Terra Nova (Bahia) is a municipality in the state of Bahia in the North-East region of Brazil. It is located at a latitude 12 ° 23'30 "South and longitude 38 ° 37'30 "west.  It has a population of 13,025 (2020 estimate).

History

In 1819, a fair was instituted, to take place every Thursday, by the owner of the Engenho de Aramaré Luis Paulino d'Oliveira Pinto da França.
After this a town must have grown around the fair grounds, and on land given by the family of Arthur Pacheco Pereira, a champion of the town's emancipation.

See also
List of municipalities in Bahia

References

Municipalities in Bahia